Elections to City of York Council were held in 2003.  The whole council was up for election. Boundary changes had reduced the number of seats from 53 to 47.

The election saw York's Labour Party lose control of the council covering central York for the first time since 1984. The Liberal Democrats won control of the council covering central York for the first time since the Liberal Party had last run the York Corporation in 1899.

The Council was made up of 29 Liberal Democrats, 15 Labour, two Green and one independent.

Election result

 There were boundary changes in 18 wards, which elected 41 city councillors. There were no boundary changes in 4 wards, which elected 6 city councillors.

Ward results

Acomb ward

 * Represented the Acomb ward of City of York Council, 19992003 
 † Represented the Acomb ward of York City Council, 19861996,  and the Acomb ward of City of York Council, 19952003

Bishopthorpe ward
The parishes of Acaster Malbis and Bishopthorpe

 * Represented the Copmanthorpe ward of City of York Council, 19992003

Clifton ward

 * Represented the Clifton ward of York City Council, 19941996,  and the Clifton ward of City of York Council, 19952003  
 † Represented the Bootham ward of York City Council, 19821996,  the Fishergate division of North Yorkshire County Council, 19851989,  and the Bootham ward of City of York Council, 19952003  
 ‡ Represented the Clifton Without ward of Ryedale District Council, 19911996,  and the Clifton Without ward of City of York Council, 19952003

Derwent ward
The parishes of Dunnington, Holtby, and Kexby

 * Represented the Dunnington and Kexby ward of City of York Council, 19992003

Dringhouses and Woodthorpe ward

 * Represented the Foxwood ward of York City Council, 19901996,  and the Foxwood ward of City of York Council, 19952003  
 † Represented the Walmgate ward of York City Council, 19801988, and the Heworth ward of York City Council, 19901996,  and the Micklegate ward of City of York Council, 19952003  
 ‡ Represented the Beckfield ward of City of York Council, 19952003

Fishergate ward

 * Represented the Fishergate ward of York City Council, 19881996,  and the Fishergate ward of City of York Council, 19952003  
 † Represented the Fishergate division of North Yorkshire County Council, 19891993 
 ‡ Represented the Fishergate division of North Yorkshire County Council, 19931996,  and the Fishergate ward of City of York Council, 19952003

Fulford ward
The parish of Fulford

 There were no boundary changes to Fulford ward.

Guildhall ward

 * Represented the Guildhall division of North Yorkshire County Council, 19851996,  and the Guildhall ward of City of York Council, 19952003  
 † Represented the Acomb ward of York City Council, 19791984, the Guildhall ward of York City Council, 19881996,  the Acomb division of North Yorkshire County Council, 19811989,  and the Guildhall ward of City of York Council, 19952003  
 ‡ Represented the Monk ward of City of York Council, 20002003

Haxby and Wigginton ward
The parishes of Haxby and Wigginton

 * Represented the Haxby and Wigginton ward of Ryedale District Council, 19791983, the Wigginton ward of Ryedale District Council, 19871996,  and the Wigginton ward of City of York Council, 19952003  
 † Represented the Haxby / Wigginton division of North Yorkshire County Council, 19931996,  and the Haxby ward of City of York Council, 19952003  
 ‡ Represented the Haxby ward of City of York Council, 19992003

Heslington ward
The parish of Heslington

 There were no boundary changes to Heslington ward. 
 * Represented the Heslington ward of Selby District Council, 19911996,  and the Heslington ward of City of York Council, 19952003

Heworth ward

 * Represented the Monk ward of City of York Council, 19952003  
 * Represented the Beckfield ward of City of York Council, 19992003

Heworth Without ward
The parish of Heworth Without

Holgate ward

 * Represented the Holgate ward of City of York Council, 19952003

Hull Road ward

 * Represented the Guildhall ward of York City Council, 19901996,  the Walmgate division of North Yorkshire County Council, 19851996,  and the Walmgate ward of City of York Council, 19952003  
 † Represented the Walmgate ward of York City Council, 19731996,  and the Walmgate ward of City of York Council, 19952003

Huntington and New Earswick ward
The parishes of Huntington and New Earswick

 There were no boundary changes to Huntington and New Earswick ward. 
 * Represented the Huntington and New Earswick ward of City of York Council, 19992003

Micklegate ward

 * Represented the Bishophill ward of York City Council, 19821996,  and the Bishophill ward of City of York Council, 19952003  
 † Represented the Bishophill ward of City of York Council, 20012003

Osbaldwick ward
The parishes of Murton and Osbaldwick

 * Represented the Osbaldwick / Heworth division of North Yorkshire County Council, 19851996,  and the Osbaldwick ward of City of York Council, 19992003

Rural West York ward
The parishes of Askham Bryan, Askham Richard, Copmanthorpe, Hessay, Nether Poppleton, Rufforth with Knapton, and Upper Poppleton

 * Represented the Upper Poppleton ward of City of York Council, 19992003 
 † Represented the Upper Poppleton ward of City of York Council, 19952003

Skelton, Rawcliffe, and Clifton Without ward
The parishes of Clifton Without, Rawcliffe, and Skelton

 * Represented the Rawcliffe division of North Yorkshire County Council, 19891996,  and the Rawcliffe and Skelton ward of City of York Council, 19952003  
 † Represented the Rawcliffe and Skelton ward of City of York Council, 19992003

Strensall ward
The parishes of Earswick, Stockton-on-the-Forest, and Strensall with Towthorpe

 * Represented the Skelton ward of Ryedale District Council, 19911996,  and the Strensall ward of City of York Council, 19962003

Westfield ward

 * Represented the Westfield ward of York City Council, 19791996,  the Westfield division of North Yorkshire County Council, 19931996,  and the Westfield ward of City of York Council, 19952003  
 † Represented the Westfield ward of York City Council, 19941996,  and the Westfield ward of City of York Council, 19992003  
 ‡ Represented the Westfield ward of York City Council, 19731979, the Foxwood ward of York City Council, 19791996,  the Westfield division of North Yorkshire County Council, 19731985, the Foxwood division of North Yorkshire County Council, 19851996,  and the Foxwood ward of City of York Council, 19952003  
 § Represented the Micklegate ward of York City Council, 19911996

Wheldrake ward
The parishes of Deighton, Elvington, Naburn, and Wheldrake

 There were no boundary changes to Wheldrake ward. 
 * Represented the Copmanthorpe ward of City of York Council, 19992003

References

2003 English local elections
2003
2000s in York